Big River is a Canadian rural community in Gloucester County, New Brunswick. It is the northernmost community in the local service district of Big River, which had a population of 721 inhabitants in 2016.

History

Notable people

See also
List of communities in New Brunswick

References

Communities in Gloucester County, New Brunswick
Designated places in New Brunswick
Local service districts of Gloucester County, New Brunswick